A Game for Girls is a 2008 Italian youth drama film directed by Matteo Rovere. It entered the competition at the 2008 Rome International Film Festival.

Cast 
Chiara Chiti as Elena Chiantini
Desirèe Noferini as Michela Ricasoli
Nadir Caselli as Alice Paoletti
Chiara Paoli as Livia Cerulli
Filippo Nigro as Mario Landi
Valeria Milillo as Matilde Chiantini
Stefano Santospago as Lorenzo Chiantini

See also  
 List of Italian films of 2008

References

External links

2008 films
Italian drama films
2008 drama films
Films directed by Matteo Rovere
2008 directorial debut films
Films set in Lucca
2000s Italian films
2000s Italian-language films